R v Cheshire [1991] 1 WLR 844 is an English criminal law case establishing the role of the jury in finding liability for death, where subsequent medical negligence occurs following the original injury. The Court of Appeal found that the jury did not have to weigh up different causes of death, and need only be satisfied that the defendant's actions made a "significant contribution" to the victim's death.

Facts
On 9 December 1987, the appellant attacked and shot a man in a fish and chip shop, following an argument. The victim was admitted to hospital and underwent surgery, though he developed a respiratory problem requiring a tracheostomy tube to be inserted into his windpipe. On 8 February 1988, and again on 14 February, the victim complained that he was having difficulty breathing, dying shortly after. Medical evidence at the defendant's trial was given that the victim's death was the result of his doctor's failure to diagnose the reason behind his breathlessness and respiratory obstruction. Nevertheless, the defendant was convicted, with the trial Judge instructing the jury they could find the defendant's chain of causation could only be broken if they were satisfied that the medical staff had been reckless in their treatment.

Judgment
The Court of Appeal, having been referred to the earlier judgment of R v Jordan, rejected the appellant's argument that the trial Judge had misdirected the jury with regard to the medical staff's acts. Beldam LJ stated that it was only necessary for the Crown to prove that the defendant's actions caused the victim's death, but not that they need be the only or even main cause of death. As a general principle, the Court stated that:

The judgment therefore consigns the verdict given in R v Jordan to exceptional cases where the operative cause of death is not the result of the defendant's acts. The ordinary consideration for a jury must be whether the negligent treatment of a victim is so independent of the defendant's acts that it renders them insignificant to the eventual death.

See also
 R v Jordan
 R v Smith (Thomas Joseph)

References

C
1991 in case law
1991 in British law
Court of Appeal (England and Wales) cases